William Hewitt (17 January 1795 – 1870) was an English cricketer who was associated with Nottingham Cricket Club and made his first-class debut in 1827. He played for Nottingham from 1817 to 1829.

References

1795 births
1870 deaths
English cricketers
English cricketers of 1826 to 1863
Nottingham Cricket Club cricketers